"Better the Devil You Know" is a song by Australian singer-songwriter Kylie Minogue, taken from her third studio album Rhythm of Love (1990). The song was written and produced by Stock Aitken Waterman. The song was released as the album's lead single on 30 April 1990 by PWL and Mushroom Records. "Better the Devil You Know" is known as the song that re-invented Minogue with more sex appeal, as her previous albums were presented with her "girl next door" persona. Her music onwards presented a more independent approach.

The song's title is a reference to an idiom. Lyrically, the song was said to be about Minogue's leaving of her TV series Neighbours and her relationship with her then-boyfriend, INXS frontman and singer Michael Hutchence. The song was lauded by music critics, who noted the imagery change in her music. They also complimented the song itself and felt it was one of Minogue's best - a highlight of not just her studio album but her compilations as well. Commercially, it was successful. The song peaked at number two in the United Kingdom and four in her native Australia. In other regions, it managed to peak inside the top forty in all the countries it charted in, including France, Austria, Germany, Ireland, New Zealand, Sweden and Switzerland.

The accompanying music video for "Better the Devil You Know" was directed by Paul Goldman and was filmed in Melbourne, Australia. Though its imagery was criticized for her mature look, the video has also been iconic to Minogue's artistry, style and imagery beyond the song. The song has been featured in most of Minogue's concert tours. The song was later re-recorded in 2012 at the Abbey Road Studios for inclusion on Minogue's orchestral album The Abbey Road Sessions.

Background and composition
"Better the Devil You Know" was written by Mike Stock, Matt Aitken and Pete Waterman, who also were the only producers and songwriters of Minogue's two albums after her debut. However, this album featured additional production by some minor producers. When the song was first in the making, Minogue had announced she would be leaving the cast of the TV series Neighbours, to focus on her music career. After this, many fans of her role were upset and saddened by her leaving. Later, Waterman heard that Minogue had stopped going out with her Neighbours co-star Jason Donovan and was dating INXS lead singer Michael Hutchence. He then told Stock "how it was [better the devil you know] as they feared their lives were going to be hell as a consequence."

The first verse features notes spanning from A-Cm-D-D2-Dm-E-Bm-D. When it reaches the chorus, the song spans from A-Fm-A-D, and repeats everyline. When it reaches the bridge, the songs chords span from A-Fm-A-F in each line. According to William Baker, a writer and one of Minogue's best friends, who wrote the book Kylie: La La La said "The song also featured a more mature sound, a more polished production and a vocal that was less layered than before." He then carried on saying about Minogue's persona as the Queen of Disco and Princess of Pop saying "The track transferred well onto the dance-floor and heralded a long reign for Kylie as the new queen of disco... a pop princess".

Critical reception
"Better the Devil You Know" is one of Minogue's most famous singles, and ever since its release it has been lauded by music critics. David Giles from Music Week complimented SAW's songwriting, adding that it "seems to be growing increasingly sophisticated." He stated that "musically this is Kylie's best record by a mile, boosted by some invigorating chord changes and strong Seventies soul influence." Mike Soutar from Smash Hits felt that Minogue's voice is in "absolutely tip-top shape - there's no doubt she's a much improved singer these days." Jonathan Bernstein from Spin viewed it as a "knockout" pop single, that "mirrored her evolution from tomboy to dreamboat."

Jason Shawahn from About.com said along with "What Do I Have To Do" and "Wouldn't Change A Thing"; "are nothing if not pop masterpieces." Hunter Felt from PopMatters said along with "Je Ne Sais Pas Pourquoi" and "Shocked" are pure pop moments. He then described it "as almost soulful rave-ups".

Chart performance

In the UK, "Better the Devil You Know" became Minogue's fifth non-consecutive number two single, being blocked by Adamski's "Killer". The song stayed at number two for two consecutive weeks, and spent a total of 10 weeks in the chart. It was certified silver by the British Phonographic Industry (BPI) having sold 340,000 copies. In Minogue's native Australia, the song debuted at five on the week end of 10 June 1990. The song peaked at number four in its third week on the chart and spent a total of thirteen weeks in the Top 50. It was certified gold by the Australian Recording Industry Association (ARIA) with sales exceeding 35,000 copies. However, in New Zealand the song was not a great success, debuting at number thirty-four, but falling out from number forty the next week. It re-entered at number twenty-seven, where it eventually peaked and charted for four weeks.

In France, the song debuted at number thirty-eight, and after weeks on the chart it peaked at number thirteen for a single week. The song topped the charts in Israel, number four in Malaysia and eleven in Spain.

Music video
The accompanying music video for "Better the Devil You Know" was directed by Paul Goldman and was filmed in Melbourne. The video caused some controversy as it presented Minogue in a much more mature image than videos from earlier years. The making of the video was the first time Minogue "felt part of the creative process". She said: "I wasn’t in charge but I had a voice. I’d bought some clothes on King's Road for the video. I saw a new way to express my point of view creatively."

In the video, Minogue can be seen dancing more suggestively than in her previous efforts. At the time she was dating INXS singer Michael Hutchence, she is wearing one of his rings in the clip, a large silver 'M'. His mother, Patricia Glassop, a make up artist did the make up. The video remains a major milestone in Minogue's career, for it was the birth of a more experimental and sexual Kylie.

Live performances
Since its debut in the Enjoy Yourself Tour. "Better the Devil You Know" has been performed at almost all of Minogue's tours. In the Enjoy Yourself, Rhythm of Love and Let's Get to It tours, the song was performed as the original as the encore to each show. The song was then performed as the encore on the Intimate and Live tour where Minogue wore a red corset with red devil horns. For the performance, an array of men dressed in red briefs entered the stage for the dance section of the song. On the On a Night Like This tour, a big band version was performed where Minogue was in full white with a tailcoat and a top hat. William Baker stated in the book "La La La" this was due to the recently released Steps version and to avoid post Spinning Around fans thinking Kylie's was the cover. In 2002, Minogue performed the song as the second-to-last song on her Fever tour. This too featured a dance section, similar to the one performed on the Intimate and Live Tour. Minogue then opened her Showgirl Tour with the song. She wore a blue corset, a showgirl crown and a blue bussel. In 2006 and 2007, Minogue again opened her Homecoming Tour with the song this time dressed in pink. In 2008/09, the song was used in a pre-encore act of her KylieX2008 tour. She performed it wearing a green feather dress. This song was then dropped and placed in the regular encore. In 2009, the same version was then performed on her North American tour as the opening to the encore. The song's most recent performance was on Minogue's Aphrodite: Les Folies Tour in 2011. The song opened her seventh act where Minogue wore a white tank top, blue hot pants and an orange feathery throw over. This version included a dance interlude at the beginning which had a very Latin-pop feel. There was also a dance interlude in the middle with the same sort of feel. Kylie performed an a cappella version of the song in the Kiss Me Once Tour, after a fan request and the album version in Dubai which was later used as an opening for Minogue's Summer 2015 tour. In 2016, a remix of the song was later used as an opening for Minogue's festival shows. The song was performed once again during her Golden Tour in 2018 and her Summer 2019 Tour.
The song was also performed on:
 An Audience with Kylie Minogue 2001 TV special, big band version performed with Adam Garcia.
 The X Factor UK, a duet with Leon Jackson in 2007 final.
 Alan Carr: Chatty Man, 2012, The Abbey Road Sessions version.

Legacy
In 1998, Australian record company Mushroom Records re-issued the song as part of their 25th Anniversary Celebrations. The re-issue reached number 59 on the Australian ARIA Charts in March 1998.

British magazine Classic Pop ranked it number 7 in their list of Top 40 Stock Aitken Waterman songs in 2021, adding, "For many the moment Kylie went from virtuous pop star to racy nubile, Better The Devil You Know arrived in a mist of twirling dance-pop and palms-to-the-sky goodness, giving her a touch of avant class. The track was reportedly written in reference to her relationship with Michael Hutchence, and the lyric drew attention from darker quarters when vampiric Aussie Nick Cave defined it as “one of pop music’s most violent and distressing love lyrics”. For Cave, Minogue’s innocence planted against the sinister verse was bone-chillingly effective. It won over Europe and became a UK No.2."

Formats and track listings

 CD single
 "Better the Devil You Know" – 3:52
 "Better the Devil You Know" (the Mad March Hare mix) – 7:09
 "I'm Over Dreaming (Over You)" – 3:21

 7-inch and cassette single
A. "Better the Devil You Know" – 3:52
B. "I'm Over Dreaming (Over You)" – 3:21

 12-inch and maxi-cassette single
A. "Better the Devil You Know" (the Mad March Hare mix) – 7:09
B. "I'm Over Dreaming (Over You)" – 4:54

 Digital EP
 "Better the Devil You Know" – 3:52
 "Better the Devil You Know" (the Mad March Hare mix) – 7:06
 "Better the Devil You Know" (Dave Ford remix) – 5:48
 "Better the Devil You Know" (alternative mix) – 3:18
 "Better the Devil You Know" (7-inch instrumental) – 3:52
 "Better the Devil You Know" (7-inch backing track) – 3:52
 "I'm Over Dreaming (Over You)" (remix) – 3:20
 "I'm Over Dreaming (Over You)" (extended remix) – 4:54
 "I'm Over Dreaming (Over You)" (remix instrumental) – 3:20
 "I'm Over Dreaming (Over You)" (remix backing track) – 3:20

Charts and certifications

Weekly charts

Year-end charts

Certifications

Steps version

British pop group Steps had recorded a cover version of the single for their second studio album Steptacular. Steps cover of "Better the Devil You Know" was later included as the opening track on their third studio album Buzz, however the song did not serve as a lead single, but was released as a joint single. A limited edition of the single was released as a digipack that was included with a doubled sided poster in the sleeve, one side was the group pictured in their dance outfits and the other side shows the groups in their costumes and the different scenarios that are shown throughout the music video.

Though it did not manage to match the success of the original version, it did chart in some markets, including Australia, the Netherlands, Switzerland, and Belgium. The song features Claire, Lisa and Faye on lead vocals.

Track listing
 "Say You'll Be Mine" – 3:32
 "Better the Devil You Know" – 3:49
 "Better the Devil You Know" (2T's 2 Go Mix) – 5:53

Credits and personnel

A-side: "Say You'll Be Mine"
Credits are adapted from the liner notes of Steptacular.

Recording
 Recorded at PWL Studios, Manchester, in 1999
 Mixed at PWL Studios, Manchester
 Mastered at Transfermation Studios, London

Vocals
 Lead and background vocals – Claire Richards, Faye Tozer, Lisa Scott-Lee, Lee Latchford-Evans, Ian "H" Watkins

Personnel
 Songwriting – Mark Topham, Karl Twigg, Lance Ellington
 Production – Dan Frampton, Pete Waterman
 Mixing – Dan Frampton
 Engineer – Dan Frampton
 Drums – Pete Waterman
 Keyboards – Andrew Frampton
 Guitar – Greg Bone
 Bass – Dan Frampton

A-side: "Better the Devil You Know"
Credits are adapted from the liner notes of Buzz.

Recording
 Recorded at PWL Studios, Manchester, in 1999
 Mixed at PWL Studios, Manchester
 Mastered at Transfermation Studios, London

Vocals
 Lead vocals – Claire Richards, Lisa Scott-Lee, Faye Tozer
 Background vocals – Lee Latchford-Evans, Ian "H" Watkins

Personnel
 Songwriting – Mike Stock, Matt Aitken, Pete Waterman
 Production – Mark Topham, Karl Twigg, Pete Waterman
 Mixing – Dan Frampton
 Engineer – Tim Speight
 Drums – Dan Frampton
 Keyboards  Karl Twigg
 Bass  Mark Topham

Charts

Other cover versions

Australian singer Penny Flanagan recorded a cover version for the 1997 film Dust Off The Wings.

In 2009, European pop group Village Boys made a version of the song. In 2010, Miss Fitz, from Eurovision: Your Country Needs You, sang this song. Miss Fitz was also in X Factor the year before but only made it to bootcamp stage.

References

1990 singles
1990 songs
1999 singles
Kylie Minogue songs
Eurodance songs
Jive Records singles
Mushroom Records singles
Pete Waterman Entertainment singles
Song recordings produced by Stock Aitken Waterman
Songs written by Matt Aitken
Songs written by Mike Stock (musician)
Songs written by Pete Waterman
Steps (group) songs